Jake Borelli (born May 13, 1991) is an American actor. He is known for his roles as Wolfgang on the Nickelodeon comedy series The Thundermans (2015–2018) and Dr. Levi Schmitt on the ABC medical drama Grey's Anatomy (2017–present).

Early life 
Borelli was born in Columbus, Ohio, to Linda Borelli and Mike Borelli. He has two older brothers, Ben and Zack. He enjoys painting, art and considered attending art school when he won a national art competition during his senior year of high school. In 2009, he graduated from Upper Arlington High School and was accepted to University of California, Los Angeles and Ohio State University but decided to move to Los Angeles to pursue acting. Whilst in Columbus, Borelli also performed in more than a dozen shows with the Columbus Children's Theatre which included roles in Cheaper by the Dozen; The Lion, The Witch and The Wardrobe; Wiley and the Hairy Man, and Holes.

Personal life 
Jake Borelli publicly came out as gay on his personal Instagram in November 2018, moments after the airing of the sixth episode of Grey's Anatomys fifteenth season, in which his character, Dr. Levi Schmitt, also came out.

Career
Upon moving to Los Angeles, Borelli quickly landed supporting roles in television shows such as iCarly, Parenthood, NCIS: Los Angeles, True Jackson, VP, Greek and Suburgatory. He has also appeared in several short films.

In 2017, he landed a role in the Netflix comedy drama film Reality High. That same year it was announced that Borelli would be playing intern Dr. Levi Schmitt on Grey's Anatomy.

Filmography

Film

Television

References

External links

1991 births
Living people
People from Columbus, Ohio
American male television actors
American male film actors
American people of Italian descent
American gay actors
LGBT people from Ohio